Gonystylus macrophyllus is a species of plant in the family Thymelaeaceae. It is native to Indonesia, Malaysia, the Nicobar Islands, Papua New Guinea, East Timor, the Solomon Islands, and possibly the Philippines.

References

macrophyllus
Flora of Malesia
Flora of Papuasia
Flora of the Nicobar Islands
Taxonomy articles created by Polbot